R25 may refer to:

Automobiles 
 BMW R25, a German motorcycle
 Renault 25, a French executive car
 Renault R25, a Formula One car
 Yamaha YZF-R25, a Japanese motorcycle

Aviation 
 British Airship R25, a training airship
 Rubik R-25 Mokány, a Hungarian glider
 Tumansky R-25, a Soviet turbojet engine

Roads 
 R-25 regional road (Montenegro)
 R25 (South Africa)

Other uses 
 R25 (London), a proposed railway orbital in Greater London
 R25: Toxic if swallowed, a risk phrase
 R-25 Vulkan, a Yugoslav surface-to-air missile
 , a destroyer of the Royal Navy
 Remington Model R-25, a semi-automatic rifle
 , a submarine of the United States Navy